Alexandre Moniz Barbosa is a Goan journalist and writer, and winner of the 2013 biennial Goan Short Story competition.

Barbosa has written, inter alia, for the Times of India. After a spell as Assistant Editor at Goa Today, he became Assistant Resident Editor for the Times of India, Goa Edition.

Literary writing
Barbosa wrote the novel Touched By The Toe (2004), set in sixteenth-century Goa, and taking its name an incident in which a Portuguese noblewoman bit off a toe from the relics of St Francis Xavier.

He translated from Portuguese to English essays by José Inácio Candido de Loyola, as Passionate and Unrestrained (2008).

In 2011 he published the book Goa Rewound, a socio-political commentary on Goa.

He has also written scholarly articles and short stories.

References

Living people
21st-century Indian short story writers
Indian male short story writers
Novelists from Goa
Indian male novelists
Year of birth missing (living people)
Place of birth missing (living people)
21st-century Indian novelists
21st-century Indian male writers